The Strand underpass is a one-way road tunnel in central London connecting Waterloo Bridge to Kingsway near Holborn. Opened in 1964, it was built within the former Kingsway tramway subway, which closed in the 1950s.

History
The new underpass was built by John Mowlem & Co and opened on 21 January 1964. The headroom is only  due to the tunnel having to pass beneath the bridge abutment by a 1:12 gradient. An electronic 'eye' alerts drivers of tall vehicles and diverts them to an 'escape route' to the left of the entrance. However, high vehicles do still try to pass through and so get stuck occasionally.

The underpass is a concrete box within the former tram subway, with the road surface at the original track level. At the northern end of the underpass the road rises to the surface on a new carriageway supported by metal pillars. This passes through the site of the former Aldwych tramway station; because of the greater width requirement, 27 trees and some pavement sections were removed for it to be constructed.

The tunnel is used by the 521 bus route northbound. In 2012, the direction of traffic in the tunnel was temporarily reversed, so that it was in use by southbound traffic. This was to facilitate easier traffic flow during the 2012 Summer Olympics.

References

Tunnels in London
Transport architecture in London
Road tunnels in England